Eta  (uppercase , lowercase ;  ē̂ta  or  ita ) is the seventh letter of the Greek alphabet, representing the close front unrounded vowel .

In the later system of (Classical) Greek numerals eta represents 8. 

Eta was derived from the Phoenician letter heth . Letters that arose from eta include the Latin H and the Cyrillic letter И and Й.

History

Consonant h

The letter shape 'H' was originally used in most Greek dialects to represent the voiceless glottal fricative . In this function, it was borrowed in the 8th century BC by the Etruscan and other Old Italic alphabets, which were based on the Euboean form of the Greek alphabet. This also gave rise to the Latin alphabet with its letter H.

Other regional variants of the Greek alphabet (epichoric alphabets), in dialects that still preserved the sound , employed various glyph shapes for consonantal heta side by side with the new vocalic eta for some time. 
In the southern Italian colonies of Heracleia and Tarentum, the letter shape was reduced to a "half-heta" lacking the right vertical stem (Ͱ). From this sign later developed the sign for rough breathing or spiritus asper,  which brought back the marking of the   sound into the standardized post-classical (polytonic) orthography.
Dionysius Thrax in the second century BC records that the letter name was still pronounced heta (ἥτα), correctly explaining this irregularity by stating "in the old days the letter Η served to stand for the rough breathing, as it still does with the Romans."

Long e
In the East Ionic dialect, however, the sound  disappeared by the sixth century BC, and the letter was re-used initially to represent a development of a long open front unrounded vowel , which later merged in East Ionic with the long open-mid front unrounded vowel  instead. In 403 BC, Athens took over the Ionian spelling system and with it the vocalic use of H (even though it still also had the  sound itself at that time). This later became the standard orthography in all of Greece.

Itacism
During the time of post-classical Koiné Greek, the  sound represented by eta was raised and merged with several other formerly distinct vowels, a phenomenon called iotacism or itacism, after the new pronunciation of the letter name as ita instead of eta.

Itacism is continued into Modern Greek, where the letter name is pronounced  and represents the close front unrounded vowel . It shares this function with several other letters (ι, υ) and digraphs (ει, οι), which are all pronounced alike.

Cyrillic script
Eta was also borrowed with the sound value of  into the Cyrillic script, where it gave rise to the Cyrillic letter И.

Uses

Letter
In Modern Greek, due to iotacism, the letter (pronounced ) represents a close front unrounded vowel, . In Classical Greek, it represented the long open-mid front unrounded vowel .

Symbol

Upper case
The uppercase letter Η is used as a symbol in textual criticism for the Alexandrian text-type (from Hesychius, its once-supposed editor).

In chemistry, the letter H as symbol of enthalpy sometimes is said to be a Greek eta, but since enthalpy comes from ἐνθάλπος, which begins in a smooth breathing and epsilon, it is more likely a Latin H for 'heat'.

In information theory the uppercase Greek letter Η is used to represent the concept of entropy of a discrete random variable.

Lower case
The lowercase letter η is used as a symbol in:
Thermodynamics, the efficiency of a Carnot heat engine, or packing fraction.
Aeronautics, the propulsive efficiency, or percentage of chemical energy converted to kinetic energy. 
Chemistry, the hapticity, or the number of atoms of a ligand attached to one coordination site of the metal in a coordination compound. For example, an allyl group can coordinate to palladium in the η¹ mode (only one atom of an allyl group attached to palladium) or the η³ mode (3 atoms attached to palladium).
Optics, the electromagnetic impedance of a medium, or the quantum efficiency of detectors.
Particle physics, to represent the η mesons.
Experimental particle physics, η stands for pseudorapidity.
Cosmology, η represents conformal time; dt = adη.
Cosmology, baryon–photon ratio.
Relativity and Quantum field theory (physics), η (with two subscripts) represents the metric tensor of Minkowski space (flat spacetime).
Statistics, η2 is the "partial regression coefficient". η is the symbol for the linear predictor of a generalized linear model, and can also be used to denote the median of a population, or thresholding parameter in Sparse Partial Least Squares regression.
Economics, η is the elasticity.
Astronomy, the seventh-brightest (usually) star in a constellation. See Bayer designation.
Mathematics, η-reduction in lambda calculus.
Mathematics, the Dirichlet eta function, Dedekind eta function, and Weierstrass eta function.
In category theory, the unit of an adjunction or monad is usually denoted η.
Biology, a DNA polymerase found in higher eukaryotes and implicated in Translesion Synthesis.
Neural network backpropagation, and stochastic gradient descent more generally, η stands for the learning rate.
Telecommunications, η stands for efficiency
Electronics, η stands for the ideality factor of a bipolar transistor, and has a value close to 1.000.  It appears in contexts where the transistor is used as a temperature sensing device, e.g. the thermal "diode" transistor that is embedded within a computer's microprocessor.
Power electronics, η stands for the efficiency of a power supply, defined as the output power divided by the input power.
Atmospheric science, η represents absolute atmospheric vorticity.
Rheology, η represents viscosity.
Oceanography, η is the measurement (usually in metres) of sea-level height above or below the mean sea-level at that same location.

Character encodings

Greek Eta, Coptic Ayta

Mathematical Eta

These characters are used only as mathematical symbols. Stylized Greek text should be encoded using the normal Greek letters, with markup and formatting to indicate text style.

See also
Hurricane Eta

References

Greek letters
Vowel letters